Abdullahi Mohammed is a retired Nigerian Army major general, who served as chief of staff to presidents Olusegun Obasanjo and Umaru Musa Yar'Adua from 1999 to 2008; National Security Adviser to General Abdusalami Abubakar from 1998 to 1999; Director General of the National Security Organization from 1976 to 1979; and Governor of Benue-Plateau State, Nigeria from July 1975 to February 1976 during the military regime of General Murtala Mohammed.

Murtala and Obasanjo years 
In July 1975, Mohammed was Director of Military Intelligence, and formed and executed the 1975 Nigerian coup d'état plan with other officers including Shehu Musa Yar'Adua, Joseph Nanven Garba, Muhammadu Buhari and Ibrahim Taiwo to depose General Yakubu Gowon, after which they transferred power to General Murtala Muhammed as head of state.

Immediately after the coup, he was appointed Governor of Benue Plateau State.

After Olusegun Obasanjo had taken over control, he recalled Mohammed in March 1976, and appointed him to the Supreme Military Council as Director General of the Nigeria Security Organisation with the additional responsibility for police security. Later he was made director of military intelligence.

Second Republic 
After General Olusegun Obasanjo handed over to elected civilians at the start of the Nigerian Second Republic in 1979, Muhammed retired from the army.
He went into private business, becoming managing director of Atoto Press in Ilorin.

National Security Adviser 
In 1998, General Abdusalami Abubakar who took over as head of state after the death of General Sani Abacha, removed Ismaila Gwarzo and appointed Mohammed as National Security Adviser.

Fourth Republic 
In 1999, President Olusegun Obasanjo made Mohammed his chief of staff, and President Umaru Yar'Adua re-appointed Mohammed as Chief of Staff when he assumed office on May 29, 2007. Mohammed resigned on 2 June 2008.

References

Nigerian generals
1939 births
Living people
Nigerian Muslims
Directors General of the National Security Organization
Directors General of the State Security Service (Nigeria)
Nigerian security personnel
National Security Organization staff
Nigerian Army officers
Graduates of the Royal Military Academy Sandhurst